Yevgeni Aleksandrovich Kochergin  (born November 7, 1945, Stalingrad, USSR) is a Soviet and Russian speaker and presenter. The announcer Central Television Broadcaster of the USSR.  He awarded the honorary title of Honored Artist of Russia.

18 to 21 August 1991, the period of August coup on the central television program Vremya with the speaker Vera Shebeko issued a statement State Committee on the State of Emergency on discharge from the post of President of the USSR Gorbachev and the introduction of a state of emergency.

Personal life 
Wife Nina Guseva — civil engineer. Two daughters from two marriages official Irina Volodina (15 September 1979  — 14 January 2016; was killed by falling elevator), a graduate of MGIMO,   Natalia, a lawyer.

References

External links
 Yevgeni Kochergin's Biography

1945 births
People of the 1991 Soviet coup d'état attempt
Soviet journalists
Russian male journalists
Living people
Soviet television presenters
Honored Artists of the RSFSR
Mass media people from Volgograd
Radio and television announcers